The Lanzhou South Ring Expressway, designated G2201, is a  that bypasses the built-up area of Lanzhou on the south side, the capital of Gansu Province. Construction started in 2014 and the Expressway was opened on 29 December 2018. The construction cost was budgeted at 11.8 billion yuan.

Together with the northern bypass formed by G6 Beijing–Lhasa Expressway and G30 Lianyungang–Khorgas Expressway, it forms a full Expressway Ring Road around Lanzhou. The Lanzhou North Ring Road forms an inner ring road, although it is not built to Expressway standards. Before opening of the Expressway, all traffic from the directions of Linxia and Lintao County over G75 Lanzhou–Haikou Expressway terminated in the built up area of Lanzhou with few grade-separated junctions. The terminus of G75 is at a toll station on a long downward slop, with many hundreds of incidents involving brake failure of heavy trucks taking place. Heavy trucks are since required to use the Ring Expressway, avoiding the hazardous situation.

Lanzhou South Service Area is the largest service area in Gansu province.

Engineering works

The expressway runs through mountainous loess landscape. The road runs over 20 bridges, and through 17 tunnels, 58.4% of the length is made up by bridges and tunnels.

Exit list

References

See also

Chinese national-level expressways
Expressways in Gansu